Aleksandar Davidov (born 7 October 1983) is a Serbian professional footballer who plays as a winger for Hajduk Kula.

Club career
Davidov started out at Hajduk Kula, making his senior debut in 2000. He spent the following 10 years at the club, before transferring to Partizan in the 2009–10 winter transfer window. Until the end of the season, Davidov appeared in all of his team's 15 league games and scored three goals, thus helping them win their third consecutive title. He subsequently made his UEFA Champions League debut in the 2010–11 campaign, coming on as a substitute for Almami Moreira in a 0–3 home loss to Shakhtar Donetsk. In September 2011, Davidov was loaned to Israeli club Hapoel Acre until the end of the season.

International career
Davidov earned one cap for Serbia, coming on as a substitute for Dušan Tadić in a 3–0 away friendly win over Japan in April 2010.

Statistics

Honours
Partizan
 Serbian SuperLiga: 2009–10, 2010–11
 Serbian Cup: 2010–11
2020-2021 FK Tvrđava Bač, 2021-2022 FK Tvrđava Bač

References

External links
 
 
 
 
 

Agrotikos Asteras F.C. players
Association football midfielders
Bnei Sakhnin F.C. players
Expatriate footballers in Greece
Expatriate footballers in Israel
F.C. Ashdod players
First League of Serbia and Montenegro players
FK TSC Bačka Topola players
FK ČSK Čelarevo players
FK Hajduk Kula players
FK Partizan players
Football League (Greece) players
Hapoel Acre F.C. players
Israeli Premier League players
Serbia and Montenegro footballers
Serbia and Montenegro under-21 international footballers
Serbia international footballers
Serbian expatriate footballers
Serbian expatriate sportspeople in Greece
Serbian expatriate sportspeople in Israel
Serbian First League players
Serbian footballers
Serbian SuperLiga players
Footballers from Novi Sad
1983 births
Living people